Luiz Fernando Iubel (born 13 March 1989) is a Brazilian football coach. He is the current assistant manager of Cuiabá.

Career
Born in Curitiba, Paraná, Iubel moved to the United States in 2009 to study at Berea College, where he played college soccer. Graduated in 2012, he returned to Brazil in the following year, and started working at Coritiba in the marketing area of the club before becoming an analyst.

Joining Bahia as an analyst in 2014, Iubel became the under-20 manager of Tricolor de Aço in 2015, and in 2017, after the appointment of Preto Casagrande as first team manager, he became his assistant. After knowing Jorginho in his period at Bahia, Iubel subsequently worked as his assistant at Ceará, Vasco da Gama, Ponte Preta and Coritiba (two spells).

On 23 February 2021, after a short stint at Juventude, Iubel was appointed assistant manager at Cuiabá, being also the interim manager of the first team. His first match in charge occurred five days later, a 6–1 Campeonato Mato-Grossense home routing of Poconé.

Iubel returned to his assistant duties after the appointment of Alberto Valentim on 1 April 2021, but was again named interim on 29 May after Valentim was sacked. On 22 January 2022, one day after he took over Cuiabá's first team in the opening match of the campaign, he announced his departure from the club on a mutual agreement.

Iubel returned to Cuiabá on 7 May 2022, and became an interim manager of the first team for the fourth time five days later, after Pintado was sacked.

Managerial statistics

References

External links
Coritiba profile 

1989 births
Living people
Sportspeople from Curitiba
Brazilian football managers
Campeonato Brasileiro Série A managers
Cuiabá Esporte Clube managers